Philippe Godoy is a French former professional footballer who played as a midfielder in France and the United States.

Career
In 1989, Godoy began his career with Grenoble Foot 38. After a single season with Stade Brestois 29 (1993-1994), he returned to Grenoble where he played until 1997. That year, he moved to Olympique Alès. In 2000, Godoy moved to the United States and signed with the Cincinnati Riverhawks of the USL A-League. In 2001, Godoy was First Team All League with the Milwaukee Rampage. On 26 March 2003, he returned to the Riverhawks. They released him in May 2003. In 2004, Godoy briefly played for the Silverbacks. From 2007 to 2009, he played for Seyssinet-Pariset AC.

References

Living people
1971 births
French footballers
Association football midfielders
USL First Division players
Grenoble Foot 38 players
Stade Brestois 29 players
CE Sabadell FC footballers
Tours FC players
Olympique Alès players
Cincinnati Riverhawks players
Milwaukee Rampage players
Atlanta Silverbacks players
French football managers
French expatriate footballers
French expatriate sportspeople in Spain
Expatriate footballers in Spain
French expatriate sportspeople in the United States
Expatriate soccer players in the United States
Expatriate soccer managers in the United States